Sébastien Barc (Notre-Dame-d'Oé) is a paralympian athlete from France competing mainly in T46 (classification) sprint events. He is a Citoyen d'Honneur of Notre-Dame-d'Oé, and the town's gymnasium, inaugurated in 2008, was named after him.

Barc has competed at two Paralympics, the first in Sydney in 2000 and then in Athens in the 2004.  On both occasions he competed in the 100m and 200m and was part of both the 4 × 100 m and 4 × 400 m French relay teams.  Over the two games he has won seven medals a bronze in the 2004 100m, a gold followed by a silver in the 200m, two silvers in 4 × 100 m and two bronzes in the 4 × 400 m.

References

External links
 profile on paralympic.org (No longer functioning)

Paralympic athletes of France
Athletes (track and field) at the 2000 Summer Paralympics
Athletes (track and field) at the 2004 Summer Paralympics
Paralympic gold medalists for France
Paralympic silver medalists for France
Paralympic bronze medalists for France
French male sprinters
Living people
Medalists at the 2000 Summer Paralympics
Medalists at the 2004 Summer Paralympics
Year of birth missing (living people)
Paralympic medalists in athletics (track and field)
Sprinters with limb difference
Paralympic sprinters
21st-century French people